US Plaisance XIII are a French rugby league club based in Plaisance-du-Touch in the region of Haute-Garonne. Founded in 2015, they compete in the National Division 2 Aquitaine region. Home matches are played at the Stade de Plaisance.

History 

Union Sportive Plaisance XIII were formed in 2015 on the back of successful youth and ladies teams. In season 2015/16, their debut season, they finished a respectful 3rd in the regional Midi-Pyrenees league.

External links 
 

French rugby league teams
Haute-Garonne
2015 establishments in France
Rugby clubs established in 2015